Edemar Antonio Picoli (born 28 April 1972) is a Brazilian former football player and current coach. He played in Hong Kong First Division League club South China before in 2006-07 season. He joined the team in 2006 as one of the first immediate signings by Casemiro Mior after re-taking his position as South China head coach.

After the 2006-07 season, South China convenor Steven Lo announced that Picoli will not stay in the team in the next season.

He scored once for Eastern on the 2007-08 league match against Wofoo Tai Po. However, the match result was cancelled due to a technical mistake made by the referee.

Honours

Player 
 Juventude
 Copa do Brasil: 1999

Manager 
 Juventude
 Copa FGF: 2011

Career statistics
As of 23 December 2007

References

External links
 SCAA Official Blog 2號 比高 (Antonio Picoli) 
 Antônio Picoli at HKFA
 Scaafc.com 球員資料 - 2. 比高 
 

1972 births
Living people
Association football forwards
Brazilian footballers
Brazilian expatriate footballers
Association football defenders
South China AA players
Eastern Sports Club footballers
Hong Kong First Division League players
Expatriate footballers in Hong Kong
Brazilian expatriate sportspeople in Hong Kong
Brazilian football managers
Clube 15 de Novembro players
Esporte Clube Juventude players
América Futebol Clube (RN) players
Coritiba Foot Ball Club players
Centro Sportivo Alagoano players
Esporte Clube Juventude managers
Sociedade Esportiva e Recreativa Caxias do Sul managers
Associação Ferroviária de Esportes managers
Operário Ferroviário Esporte Clube managers
Capivariano Futebol Clube managers
Brusque Futebol Clube managers
Esporte Clube Pelotas managers
Expatriate footballers in China
Brazilian expatriate sportspeople in China